Sergey Aleksandrov may refer to:
Sergey Alexandrov (politician), the First Secretary of the Communist Party of the Soviet Union (2001)
Sergei Aleksandrov (footballer, born 1973), Russian association football player
Sergey Alexandrov (ice hockey) (born 1978), Kazakhstani ice hockey player
Serghei Alexandrov (born 1965), Moldovan international footballer